Romance is a 2002 South Korean television drama series starring Kim Jaewon and Kim Ha-neul. It aired on MBC on Wednesdays and Thursdays at 21:55 for 16 episodes from May 8 to June 27, 2002.

Plot
Fatal love strikes us out of a sudden and helplessly takes us deep down into the sea of fervor, giving us no choice but to yield. This drama beautifully unfolds the forbidden passion between a teacher and a student. Chae-Won and Gwan-Woo meet for the first time at a rural seaside village flower festival. They fall in love at first sight, not in their dreams have they known that Chae-Won is the teacher at Gwan-Woo's high school.

The second time they meet is at the classroom where they realize the situation and become bewildered and embarrassed.
The love story between the two young people is overlapped with Gwan-Woo's tearful success story and this inspire the viewers with high emotion.

Cast and characters

Main cast
Kim Jaewon as Choi Kwan-woo
Kim Ha-neul as Kim Chae-won
Jung Sung-hwan as Lee Eun-seok
Kim Yoo-mi as Choi Yun-hee

Supporting cast
Han Hye-jin as Yoon Ji-soo 
Kim Hae-sook as Oh Young-seok 
Hyun Suk as Choi Jang-soo 
Go Myung-hwan as Kim Bong-kyun
Shim Yang-hong as Kim Dae-kun 
Park Won-sook as President Yoon Mi-hee 
Kim Yong-gun as Chairman Lee Young-kyu 
Ahn Yeon-hong as Seo Min-joo 
Moon Ji-yoon as Choi Jang-bi 
Lee Byung-joon as Choi Gong-myung 
Jung Kyung-soon as a female teacher who smokes
Kang Rae-yeon as So-young's friend
Lee Min-ho as a student
Kim Kyo-chul
Lee Eung-kyung
Lee Gun-joo
Lee Jong-rae

References

External links
Romance official MBC website 

MBC TV television dramas
2002 South Korean television series debuts
2002 South Korean television series endings
Korean-language television shows
South Korean romance television series